Rahmatabad (also Romanized as Raḩmatābād; also known as Kalāteh-ye Mīrzā) is a village in Baghestan Rural District, in the Eslamiyeh District of Ferdows County, South Khorasan Province, Iran. At the 2006 census, its population was 18, in 9 families.

References 

Populated places in Ferdows County